Kacper Filipiak (born 19 November 1995) is a former Polish professional snooker player. He turned professional in 2011 after winning the European Under-21 Championship, and became Poland's first player on snooker's professional Main Tour. He was the first Polish player to make a 147 in competitive competition, doing so in a PLS Top 16 match against Marcin Nitschke. He was also a professional player from 2019 to 2021, having qualified by winning the 2019 EBSA European Snooker Championship.

Career

Debut season
The 2011/2012 snooker season was Filipiak's first as a professional. At the age of 15 he became the youngest professional player. 
Filipiak performed impressively at the Snooker World Cup, beating the likes of John Higgins, Stephen Maguire and Marco Fu in the singles matches; this led to him being tipped as a future world champion by Ronnie O'Sullivan. However, his results in the ranking tournaments were disappointing: he entered five of the eight ranking events, but failed to win a single match, picking just four frames during the season. Filipiak also had a poor set of results in the PTC events throughout the season, as he played in 10 of the 12 tournaments but did not win a match. He finished the year ranked world number 86, out of the top 64 who retained their places for the 2012/2013 season. Filipiak entered Q School in a bid to win a place for the upcoming season and played in all three events without picking up a single victory and dropped off the main snooker tour.

Amateur years
Filipiak could only enter Players Tour Championship events the 2012/2013 season. He played in five, but could only qualify for the first round in three, losing his match once there in all of them. He entered Q School in 2014 but was unable to win enough matches to earn a main tour card. He played in three of the six European Tour events in the 2014/2015 season with his only win coming at the Gdynia Open, where he beat Gerard Greene 4–2, before falling 4–0 to Oliver Lines in the second round. He once again had an unsuccessful Q School. Filipiak lost in the quarter-finals of the 2015 IBSF World Under-21 Snooker Championship 6–5 to Josh Boileau.

After beating Gerard Greene 4–3 at the Gdynia Open, Filipiak made his televised debut in the second round against Andrew Higginson and lost 4–3. He won the 2019 EBSA European Snooker Championship. He therefore gained a two-year professional tour card to return to the tour for the 2019/2020 and 2020/2021 seasons.

At the end of the 2020/2021 season, Filipiak was ranked 86th, and therefore lost his place on the tour.

Performance and rankings timeline

Career finals

Amateur finals: 8 (4 titles)

References

External links 

Kacper Filipiak at worldsnooker.com

1995 births
Living people
Polish snooker players
Sportspeople from Warsaw